Jolly Sarkar (born 30 September 1939) is an Indian former cricketer. He played twelve first-class matches for Bengal between 1964 and 1968.

See also
 List of Bengal cricketers

References

External links
 

1939 births
Living people
Indian cricketers
Bengal cricketers
People from Howrah